Madison Lee De La Garza (born December 28, 2001) is an American actress. De La Garza is known for playing Juanita Solis on Desperate Housewives. She is the younger half-sister of singer Demi Lovato.

Early life and family
Madison Lee De La Garza was born to Ford dealership manager James Edward "Eddie" De La Garza and former country singer and Dallas Cowboys Cheerleader Dianna De La Garza (born Dianna Hart on August 8, 1962). Eddie is of Mexican descent. She has two older half siblings through Dianna's first marriage to Patrick Martin Lovato (1960–2013), Dallas Lovato (born February 4, 1988) and Demi Lovato (born August 20, 1992).

Career
De La Garza's most prominent role was Juanita Solis on Desperate Housewives. Additionally, she played a younger version of her half-sibling Demi Lovato's character Sonny Munroe in "Cookie Monsters", an episode of Sonny with a Chance.

De Le Garza has also played on Bad Teacher as Kelsey, a recurring role in the series. She co-directed Pink Elephant, a short film, and directed the short Subject 16. She appeared on the Millennial Hollywood podcast to discuss Subject 16. De La Garza has a YouTube channel.

In July 2021, Variety reported De La Garza was slated to direct Surprise, a "mystery thriller about a surprise Zoom party that turns tense when the birthday girl's friends appear to know something she doesn't." The film was to star other YouTube influencers and personalities.

Filmography

Film

Television

Web

References

External links
 
 
 Mad De La Garza at YouTube

2001 births
21st-century American actresses
American actresses of Mexican descent
American child actresses
American television actresses
Hispanic and Latino American actresses
Hispanic and Latino American people in television
Living people
Actresses from Dallas